"I Don't Want to Be" is a song by American singer-songwriter Gavin DeGraw from his 2003 debut album, Chariot. The song gained exposure after being featured as the opening theme to The CW teen drama series One Tree Hill, and it was released as a radio single on February 17, 2004. It peaked at number 10 in the United States in 2005 and became a top-20 hit in Australia, the Netherlands, Norway, and Sweden.

The song is certified gold in the US, having sold over 500,000 downloads. In 2012, the song reached number 27 on the UK Singles Chart, its highest position, due to the finale of One Tree Hills ninth and final season airing, which also featured DeGraw. The song's music video follows the message of the lyrics, featuring a girl investigating her high school peers while they are frozen in time, and she eventually decides to be herself.

Background and composition
Gavin DeGraw wrote the song as a message to adolescents, encouraging them to be themselves and to not let outside factors change their personalities. DeGraw explained:

Upon finishing the song, DeGraw was happy with the results, but he was unsure if the song would become a hit despite being able to "have an impact on people's psyche and on their tapping toe". Musically, the track is written in the key of C minor and proceeds at a moderately slow tempo of 76 beats per minute.

Track listings

US promo CD
 "I Don't Want to Be" – 3:38
 "I Don't Want to Be" (call out hook) – 0:10

UK and Australian CD single
 "I Don't Want to Be" (album version) – 3:37
 "I Don't Want to Be" (Stripped/acoustic version)
 "Just Friends" (album version) – 3:24
 "I Don't Want to Be" (video)

European CD single 1
 "I Don't Want to Be" (album version) – 3:38
 "I Don't Want to Be" (Stripped version) – 4:04
 "Get Lost" – 4:26
 "I Don't Want to Be" (video)

European CD single 2
 "I Don't Want to Be"
 "I Don't Want to Be" (Stripped version)

Credits and personnel
Credits are adapted from the UK CD single liner notes.

Studios
 Recorded at Sunset Sound, The Hook, Larrabee East (Los Angeles) and The Hit Factory (New York City)
 Mixed at Larrabee North (Los Angeles)

Personnel
 Gavin DeGraw – lyrics, music, vocals, piano
 Michael Ward – guitars
 Alvin Moody – bass
 Joey Waronker – drums
 Mark Endert – production, recording, mixing
 Steve Gryphon – additional editing, additional programming

Charts and certifications

Weekly charts

Year-end charts

Certifications

Release history

Use in media
 The song is the opening theme to One Tree Hill. DeGraw performed the song on a season 1 episode of One Tree Hill. He returned for the season five finale to perform the song with Jackson Brundage. In the eighth season, several artists covered it for the season's theme music, including Spinnerette, Grace Potter, Against Me!, Kate Voegele, Tegan and Sara, Susie Suh and Patrick Stump. DeGraw also performed the song for the series finale to celebrate their 10th anniversary of Tric.
 The song appears in the game Karaoke Revolution Party and is available as part of the downloadable content in the game Karaoke Revolution: American Idol Encore.

References

2003 songs
2004 debut singles
Gavin DeGraw songs
J Records singles
One Tree Hill (TV series)
Songs about teenagers
Songs written by Gavin DeGraw
Television drama theme songs